Abhishek (born 15 August 1999) is an Indian field hockey player who plays as a forward. He made his international debut for India in February 2022 at the 2021–22 Men's FIH Pro League.

References

External links

Abhishek at Hockey India

1999 births
Living people
People from Sonipat
Indian male field hockey players
Field hockey players from Haryana
Male field hockey forwards
Field hockey players at the 2022 Commonwealth Games
Commonwealth Games silver medallists for India
Commonwealth Games medallists in field hockey
2023 Men's FIH Hockey World Cup players
Medallists at the 2022 Commonwealth Games